Xolmili (also, Kholmili) is a village and municipality in the Lankaran Rayon of Azerbaijan.  It has a population of 2,336.

References 

Populated places in Lankaran District